The Election Commission of India held indirect 2nd presidential elections of India on 6 May 1957. Dr. Rajendra Prasad won his re-election with 459,698 votes over his rivals Chowdhry Hari Ram who got 2,672 votes and Nagendra Narayan Das who got 2,000 votes. Rajendra Prasad, has been the only person, to have won and served two terms, as President of India.

Schedule
The election schedule was announced by the Election Commission of India on 6 April 1957.

Results

See also
 1957 Indian vice presidential election

References

1957 elections in India
Presidential elections in India